Edward Tarrant may refer to:
 Edward H. Tarrant, Texas politician
 Edward Tarrant (murderer), New Zealand axeman